Sangeet-Siddharth is a music composer duo of brothers Siddharth Haldipur and Sangeet Haldipur. The duo rose to prominence with their top-of-the-line composition ‘Aa Zara Kareeb Se’ from the movie Murder 2, for which they won the Big Star Young Entertainer Award for Best Music Composer in 2012. This marked their entry into the mainstream Bollywood music scene.

Career
The duo has given music for prominent Hindi as well as Marathi movies. In their few years of music direction, the duo has composed hit songs from Murder 2, Blood Money, Aatma, Fruit & Nut, Bird Idol and Hum Hai Raahi Car Ke. They have also composed the music for the promo and trailer of Rishi Vohra's novel - Once Upon the Tracks of Mumbai. Siddharth and Sangeet Haldipur are the sons of the famous composer Amar Haldipur, who was India's number one violinist in the past and who is still regarded as Bollywood's best background music composer.

Discography - Sangeet-Siddharth

Bollywood Movies

 Fruit and Nut (2009)
 Bird Idol (2010)
 Murder 2 (2011)
 Blood Money (2012)
 Once Upon the Tracks of Mumbai (2012 novel) 
 Nasha (2013)
 Aatma (2013)
 Hum Hai Raahi Car Ke (2013)
 Mad About Dance (2014)
 Untitled (2015)
Love Games (2016)
 Raaz Reboot (2016)

Marathi Movies
 Runh'' (2015, Marathi)

TV serials

Ek Boond Ishq - Title track - Life OK (2013)

Discography - Songs (partial list)

 Aa Zaraa Kareeb Se - Murder 2
 Tera Nasha - Nasha
Arzoo - Blood Money
 Aaja Nindiya - Aatma - Feel It Around You
 Tonight The Party's Going Mad - Mad About Dance
 Ek Boond Ishq - TV series title track
Tujhko Bhulana - Murder 2
Jee Le Zyaada - Aatma - Feel It Around You
Andhera Hai - Fruit and Nut
Laila - Nasha
Woh - Hum Hai Raahi Car Ke
Ding Dong Ding - Hum Hai Raahi Car Ke
Dil Jaana - Bird Idol
Oomph Soniye - Bird Idol
Khabardar (Boman Irani) - Fruit and Nut
O Meri Jaan - Raaz Reboot

References

External links

 Sangeet-Siddharth at Reverbnation

Indian musical groups
Musical groups established in 2002
2002 establishments in India